Boris Vsevolodovich Gromov (born 7 November 1943) is a prominent Russian military and political figure. From 2000 to 2012, he was the Governor of Moscow Oblast.

Biography
Born 7 November 1943 in Saratov, Russian SFSR, Soviet Union, he graduated from a Suvorov military cadet school, the Leningrad Military Commanders School and later from the Frunze Military Academy in Moscow, as well as the General Staff Academy.

During the Soviet–Afghan War, Gromov did three tours of duty (1980–1982, 1985–1986, 1987–1989), and was best known for the two years as the last Commander of the 40th Army in Afghanistan. Gromov was the last Soviet soldier to leave Afghanistan, crossing on foot the Friendship Bridge spanning the Amu-Daria river on 15 February 1989, the day the Soviet pullout from Afghanistan was completed. He received the highest military award – the golden star of the Hero of the Soviet Union after Operation Magistral had lifted the siege of the city of Khost in eastern Afghanistan.

During the Red Army withdrawal in February 1989, 30 to 40 military trucks crammed with Afghan historical treasures crossed into the Soviet Union, under orders from General Boris Gromov. He cut an antique Tekke carpet stolen from Darul Aman Palace into several pieces, and gave it to his acquaintances.

After the Afghan War, he was chosen as a candidate for Vice President by the Communist Party in the Russian presidential election of 1991 (the candidate for President was former Premier Nikolai Ryzhkov). He served as First Deputy Defence Minister of the Russian Federation. In 1994, Gromov retired from the Russian Armed Forces, and was soon appointed deputy Interior Minister. He was elected, in 1995, to the State Duma, lower house of the Russian parliament. In January 2000, he was elected governor of the Moscow region and re-elected in December 2003.

Honours and awards

 Hero of the Soviet Union
 Order of Lenin
 Order of the Red Banner, twice
 Order of the Red Star
 Order for Service to the Homeland in the Armed Forces of the USSR, 3rd class
 Medal for Combat Service
 Medal "For merits in perpetuating the memory of the fallen defenders of the Fatherland" (Russian Ministry of Defence, 2008) — for his great personal contribution to the commemoration of the fallen defenders of the Fatherland, the establishment of names of the dead and the fate of missing servicemen, displaying high moral and business qualities, diligence and intelligent initiative, to assist in the task of perpetuating the memory of the fallen defenders of the Fatherland
 Order of Merit for the Fatherland;
 1st class (2018)
 2nd class (6 November 2003) – for outstanding contribution to strengthening Russian statehood, and socio-economic development of the region
 3rd class
 4th class (7 November 2008) – for outstanding contribution to the socio-economic development of the Moscow region and many years of fruitful work
 Medal "For Impeccable Service" 1st, 2nd and 3rd classes
 Order of Prince Yaroslav the Wise, 5th class (Ukraine, 7 November 2003)
 Medal "10 Years of the Armed Forces of Ukraine"
 Order of Friendship of Peoples (Belarus) (22 November 2005) – for his significant contribution to the development of economic, scientific-technological and cultural ties between Belarus and Moscow Oblast of the Russian Federation
 Medal "In memory of the 10th anniversary of the withdrawal of Soviet troops from Afghanistan" (Belarus, 13 February 2003) – for his great personal contribution to the development and strengthening of cooperation between movements of Afghan War Veterans of the Republic of Belarus and the Russian Federation
 Medal "Fidelity" (Afghanistan, 17 November 1988)
 Order of St. Prince Vladimir Equal, 1st class (Russian Orthodox Church, 2008) – in consideration of special services for the Moscow diocese of the Russian Orthodox Church and the 65th anniversary of the birth
 Order of the Holy Prince Daniel of Moscow, 1st class
 Order of St. Sergius
 Order of Saint Blessed Grand Prince Dmitry Donskoy, 1st class
 Jubilee Medal "In Commemoration of the 100th Anniversary since the Birth of Vladimir Il'ich Lenin"
 Jubilee Medal "Twenty Years of Victory in the Great Patriotic War 1941–1945"
 Jubilee Medal "50 Years of the Armed Forces of the USSR"
 Jubilee Medal "60 Years of the Armed Forces of the USSR"
 Jubilee Medal "70 Years of the Armed Forces of the USSR"
 Order of the Red Banner (Afghanistan)
 Order of Honour (2012)

See also
Nikolai Ryzhkov presidential campaign, 1991
Austin S. Miller
Chris Donahue

References

External links
Boris Gromov, Official website of Boris Gromov 
Official website of Moscow Oblast.  Boris Gromov, Governor 
ITN & Pro Video documentary. Wars In Peace - Afghanistan (1990). Available on Google Video

|-

1943 births
Living people
Politicians from Saratov
Soviet colonel generals
Interior ministers of Russia
Deputy Defence Ministers of Russia
Soviet military personnel of the Soviet–Afghan War
Communist Party of the Soviet Union members
Politburo of the Central Committee of the Communist Party of Ukraine (Soviet Union) members
Heroes of the Soviet Union
Full Cavaliers of the Order "For Merit to the Fatherland"
Recipients of the Order of Lenin
Recipients of the Order of the Red Banner
Recipients of the Order of Holy Prince Daniel of Moscow
Recipients of the Order of Saint Righteous Grand Duke Dmitry Donskoy, 1st class
Governors of Moscow Oblast
United Russia politicians
21st-century Russian politicians
Military Academy of the General Staff of the Armed Forces of the Soviet Union alumni
Frunze Military Academy alumni
Recipients of the Order of Honour (Russia)
Gromov
Second convocation members of the State Duma (Russian Federation)
Sixth convocation members of the State Duma (Russian Federation)
Third convocation members of the State Duma (Russian Federation)
Members of the Federation Council of Russia (after 2000)
Military personnel from Saratov